Neue Frankfurter Schule (NFS, New Frankfurt School) is a group of writers and artists which was founded by former members of the editorial staff of the satirical magazine pardon. They have published the magazine Titanic from 1979.

History 
Among the founding members of the group, which first had no name, were:
 F. W. Bernstein (1938–2018)
  (born 1949)
 Robert Gernhardt (1937–2006)
  (born 1941)
  (born 1939)
  (1930–2004)
  (born 1929)
 F. K. Waechter (1937–2005)

The name Neue Frankfurter Schule was chosen in memory of the philosophical Frankfurter Schule (Frankfurt School) around Max Horkheimer and Theodor W. Adorno, among others, which had pursued a critical theory of society in the 1930s. The name Neue Frankfurter Schule alludes firstly to Frankfurt as a centre for many members and the publication of Titanic. Secondly, the name is a satiric allusion to the Franfurter Schule Thirdly, serious similarities connect the NFS to the critical theory of the former group.  regards cultural critic as the focus of the NFS, Michael Rutschky noted that the satirical conscience ("satirisches Bewußtsein") of the NFS is the focus of the Frankfurter Schule.

The name was chosen years after the forming of the group, in 1981, when a good name was needed for an exhibition of works by Gernhardt, Traxlera and Waechter.

A second generation of NFS members has included Max Goldt, Duo  and, after the Peaceful Revolution, .

In 2006, the city of Frankfurt acquired c. 7,000 original drawings by Bernstein, Gernhardt, Traxler and Poth for a new museum of comic art, the Caricatura Museum Frankfurt, which was opened on 1 October 2008 as an independent department of the Historical Museum.

Literature 
 W. P. Fahrenberg (ed.): Die Neue Frankfurter Schule, ARKANA Göttingen 1987, 
 : Die schärfsten Kritiker der Elche. Die Neue Frankfurter Schule in Wort und Strich und Bild, Berlin 2001, 
 Klaus Cäsar Zehrer: Dialektik der Satire. Zur Komik von Robert Gernhardt und der ‚Neuen Frankfurter Schule. (dissertation) Universität Bremen. 2002.

References

External links 

 
 Stadt Frankfurt kauft Werke der „Neuen Frankfurter Schule“ – Meldung des Hessischen Rundfunks (16. Mai 2006, nicht mehr online)
 Texts of the NFS

Literary circles
Caricature
Culture in Frankfurt